Crowley is an unincorporated community in Mendocino County, California.

References

Unincorporated communities in California
Unincorporated communities in Mendocino County, California